Lingulellotretidae is an extinct family of brachiopods, with an extended pseudointerarea, including some soft-shelled representatives.

The lingulellotretids are possibly close relatives of the Siphonotretids.

Soft tissue is occasionally known.

References

Brachiopod families

Cambrian genus extinctions